The 1894 Wabash football team was an American football team that represented  Wabash College in the Indiana Intercollegiate Athletic Association (IIAA) during the 1894 college football season. In its first season under head coach A. Vernon Randall, Wabash compiled a 4–5 record, 2–3 in games against IIAA opponents.

Schedule

Roster

References

Wabash
Wabash Little Giants football seasons
Wabash football